(born 5 June 1977 in Kanagawa, Japan) is a Japanese rugby union player. Soma has played 24 matches for the Japan national rugby union team.
Soma played three games for Japan at the 2007 Rugby World Cup.

References

Living people
1977 births
Japanese rugby union players
Saitama Wild Knights players
Japan international rugby union players
Sportspeople from Kanagawa Prefecture